The 2016 CAF Confederation Cup Final was the final of the 2016 CAF Confederation Cup, the 13th edition of the CAF Confederation Cup, Africa's secondary club football competition organized by the Confederation of African Football (CAF).

The final was contested in two-legged home-and-away format between MO Béjaïa of Algeria and TP Mazembe of the Democratic Republic of the Congo. The first leg was hosted by MO Béjaïa at the Stade Mustapha Tchaker in Blida on 29 October 2016, while the second leg was hosted by TP Mazembe at the Stade TP Mazembe in Lubumbashi on 6 November 2016. The winner earned the right to play in the 2017 CAF Super Cup against the winner of the 2016 CAF Champions League.

TP Mazembe defeated MO Béjaïa 5–2 on aggregate to win the competition for the first time in its history.

Road to final

Note: In all results below, the score of the finalist is given first (H: home; A: away).

Rules
The final was played on a home-and-away two-legged basis. If the aggregate score was tied after the second leg, the away goals rule would be applied, and if still tied, extra time would not be played, and the penalty shoot-out would be used to determine the winner (Regulations III. 26 & 27).

Matches

First leg

Second leg

References

External links
Orange CAF Confederation Cup 2016, CAFonline.com

2016
Final
CCC
CCC
International club association football competitions hosted by the Democratic Republic of the Congo